Syed Ahmed Pasha Quadri is current MLA from Yakutpura (Assembly constituency), from AIMIM. Quadri was the trusted mentor and close friend of late Sultan Salahuddin Owaisi. Quadri won from Charminar in 2004  and was able to retain it in 2009, 2014 and 2018 assembly elections.
Quadri is General secretary of AIMIM.

Controversy
In 2013 cases were registered against him for making hate speeches against Mahatma Gandhi. He said "The Nizams built the state assembly building in Hyderabad, but see what has happened. They have installed a statue of Mahatma Gandhi there. Who constructed it and who has been installed there," .He said "We have built all significant structures in India, What have you done?, We constructed Red Fort, Taj Mahal, Qutub Minar, Mecca Masjid and Charminar. What have you constructed in Hindustan?”

References

http://timesofindia.indiatimes.com/city/hyderabad/Case-against-MIM-MLA-Pasha-Quadri/articleshow/18097015.cms
http://www.siasat.com/news/telangana-court-summons-aimim-mla-ahmed-pasha-quadri-822799/
http://www.siasat.com/news/trs-complains-against-mrahmed-pasha-quadri-393254/

Politicians from Hyderabad, India
All India Majlis-e-Ittehadul Muslimeen politicians
Andhra Pradesh MLAs 2004–2009
Andhra Pradesh MLAs 2009–2014
Telangana MLAs 2014–2018
Telangana MLAs 2018–2023
Year of birth missing (living people)
Living people